Kalpe may refer to:
 Kalpe, the ancient name for Gibraltar
 Kalpe (Bithynia), a city of ancient Bithynia in Asia Minor
 Kalpe (river), a river of ancient Bithynia in Asia Minor